"One Thing Right" is a song by American producer Marshmello and American singer Kane Brown, released on June 21, 2019. Its music video was launched on July 19, 2019.

Background
Brown described the song as "kind of the opposite" of Marshmello's song "Happier".

Composition
"One Thing Right" is an EDM and country song fused with pop punk elements into a trap-tinged beat with some twangy vocals and banjo.

The lyrical story is that of a man who lies, steals and always gets himself in trouble. The only thing he doesn't screw up is the love he's somehow found while being such a rascal.

Promotion
Both Marshmello and Brown posted about the song on social media on June 17.

Chart performance
The song peaked at number one on the Billboards US Hot Country Songs on chart dated October 12, 2019. As of March 2020, the single has sold 273,000 copies in the US. On September 29, 2020, the single was certified double platinum by the Recording Industry Association of America (RIAA) for combined sales and streaming equivalent units of over two million units in the United States.

Music videos
The lyrics video was uploaded on YouTube on June 21, 2019, it has 21 million views after almost two months of its release. The official music video was premiered on July 19, 2019, on YouTube.

The alternate video was uploaded on July 26, 2019.

Remixes
Two remix EPs of the song were released in 2019. The first one contained remixes by Firebeatz, Duke & Jones, PMP, KDrew and DJ duo Subshock and Evangelos. The second one contained a Late Night remix by Marshmello and two remixes by Koni and Ruhde.

Charts

Weekly charts

Year-end charts

Certifications

References

2019 singles
2019 songs
Marshmello songs
Kane Brown songs
Geffen Records singles
Songs written by Marshmello
Songs written by Jesse Frasure
Songs written by Josh Hoge
Songs written by Matt McGinn (songwriter)
Songs written by Kane Brown